Collingswood station is a stop in Collingswood, New Jersey on the PATCO Speedline between Philadelphia, Pennsylvania, and Lindenwold, New Jersey. It provides access to the nearby historic and shopping district along Haddon Avenue. It also provides Park and Ride access. The station has a single island platform. It is grouped with the Westmont and Haddonfield stations in ride pricing from Philadelphia.

References

External links
Collingswood (PATCO)

Collingswood, New Jersey
PATCO Speedline stations in New Jersey
Railway stations in the United States opened in 1969
1969 establishments in New Jersey